Stanley Jefferson (born December 4, 1962) is a former center and left fielder in Major League Baseball who played for the New York Mets, San Diego Padres, New York Yankees, Baltimore Orioles, Cleveland Indians and Cincinnati Reds from  to .

Childhood and education
Jefferson, who grew up in Co-Op City in the Bronx and played many years in the Co-Op City Little League, graduated from Harry S. Truman High School in 1980, and attended Bethune-Cookman College in Daytona Beach, Florida from 1981 to 1983. He later obtained his bachelor's degree at Mercy College in Dobbs Ferry, New York.

Baseball career
Jefferson displayed impressive speed and agility and was selected by the New York Mets organization in the first round (20th pick overall) of the free agent draft on June 6, 1983.

After playing in the minors for three years, Jefferson played in 14 games for the Mets during the last month of the 1986 season before he was sent to the San Diego Padres in the nine-player Kevin McReynolds-Kevin Mitchell deal at the end of the year. Though he became a regular in the Padres outfield in 1987, he clashed with manager Larry Bowa in May and spent much of the first half on the disabled list. Jefferson stole 33 bases and batted .230 that year.

In 1988, Jefferson performed poorly, batting .144 over 111 at bats. At the end of the season he was traded with Jimmy Jones and Lance McCullers to the New York Yankees for Jack Clark and Pat Clements. He logged 12 at-bats with the Yankees before being traded to the Orioles in July 1989. For the next year and a half, he played intermittently for the Orioles, Indians, and Reds. Jefferson’s career ended in 1991 after suffering a career ending injury to his Achilles’ tendon.

Jefferson later became a coach for the Pioneer League Butte Copper Kings. When the player's strike threatened the  season, Jefferson became a much-maligned replacement player for his original team, sharing the outfield with fellow ex-Met Herm Winningham.

NYPD career
In 1997, with his baseball career over, Jefferson joined the New York City Police Department. He was on duty during the September 11, 2001 terrorist attacks, and worked at Ground Zero after the collapse of the World Trade Center. He suffered health problems as a result of his time at Ground Zero, and retired from the NYPD in 2004.

Personal life
Jefferson lives in Florida. He has two grown daughters who live in Virginia. During the peak of his career Jefferson shied away from the spotlight and preferred a private, low key profile. In 2016, in an interview on SNY, he reflected on his baseball career and his career as an NYPD officer, addressing his experience during the September 11, 2001 terrorist attacks. In 2018, Jefferson was recognized for his athletic and heroic contributions by Bethune-Cookman University and was inducted into their Hall of Fame alongside other accomplished alumni.

References

External links

Baseball Almanac

1962 births
Living people
Major League Baseball center fielders
New York Mets players
San Diego Padres players
New York Yankees players
Baltimore Orioles players
Cleveland Indians players
Cincinnati Reds players
African-American baseball players
Major League Baseball replacement players
Little Falls Mets players
Lynchburg Mets players
Jackson Mets players
Bethune–Cookman Wildcats baseball players
Tidewater Tides players
Las Vegas Stars (baseball) players
Columbus Clippers players
Rochester Red Wings players
Colorado Springs Sky Sox players
Nashville Sounds players
Baseball players from New York City
New York City Police Department officers
People from Co-op City, Bronx
Mercy College (New York) alumni
21st-century African-American people
20th-century African-American sportspeople